Frank L. Pitts (April 25, 1841 – February 4, 1905) was an American politician. He served as the State Treasurer of Missouri from 1897 to 1901.

References

State treasurers of Missouri
Missouri Democrats
People from Shelby County, Missouri
1841 births
1905 deaths